John Paul "JP" Karliak is an American actor and comedian.

He is known for voicing characters, such as Dante Crescendo in Trolls: TrollsTopia, Linus in The Stinky & Dirty Show and Wile E. Coyote in Wabbit/New Looney Tunes, Naysaya in the Disney XD animated series Star vs. the Forces of Evil. He also voiced Bailey in Disney Infinity: 3.0. Edition and The Boss Baby in the Netflix television series, The Boss Baby: Back in Business, & The Boss Baby: Back in the Crib  and the current voice of N. Tropy in the Crash Bandicoot franchise.

Early life
He graduated with a bachelor's degree in theatre from University of Southern California.

Career
He took a voice over class taught by Bob Bergen. In 2008, Karliak made his voice-acting debut in the video game Tom Clancy's EndWar as an unnamed character and others. Karliak also appears physically on-screen in live-action television series, such as Ringer and Real Husbands of Hollywood.

In 2015, he voiced Wile E. Coyote in the Cartoon Network/Warner Bros. Pictures animated television series New Looney Tunes until its cancellation in 2020. In 2016, he provided the voice of Reese in the animated feature film Batman: The Killing Joke, featuring Kevin Conroy and Mark Hamill. In 2017, he voiced Willy Wonka in the Tom & Jerry direct-to-video animated film Tom and Jerry: Willy Wonka and the Chocolate Factory.

Starting from 2018, he voices The Boss Baby in The Boss Baby: Back in Business, a Netflix television series based on Marla Frazee’s book The Boss Baby and Tom McGrath’s 2017 animated film of the same name. He then proceeded to reprise his role in the sequel series The Boss Baby: Back in the Crib, which had aired on May 19, 2022.

In the 2020 video game Crash Bandicoot 4: It's About Time, he provided the voice of Doctor Nefarious Tropy.

In 2021, he provided the English voice of S566 in the Netflix animated television series Eden, and provided the voice of Green Goblin in the Disney Junior animated television series Spidey and His Amazing Friends.

In February 2023, Karliak guest voiced Venomor, a Trandoshan mercenary leader, who works for the Empire, in Star Wars: The Bad Batch.

Personal life
Karliak is gay. In July 2022, Karliak married his boyfriend Scott Barnhardt.

Filmography

Film

Television

Video games

References

External links
 
 Official website

Living people
American gay actors
American male comedians
American male film actors
American male television actors
American male voice actors
USC Annenberg School for Communication and Journalism alumni
20th-century American male actors
21st-century American male actors
Year of birth missing (living people)
American LGBT comedians